Zoltan Lunka (born 22 May 1970 in Miercurea Nirajului, Romania) was a professional boxer, who won a Flyweight bronze medal at the 1996 Summer Olympics for Germany. A year earlier, at the 1995 World Amateur Boxing Championships in Berlin, he captured the world title.

Olympic results
Defeated Martín Castillo (Mexico) 13-7
Defeated Hermensen Ballo (Indonesia) 18-12
Defeated Mehdi Assous (Algeria) 19-6
Lost to Bulat Jumadilov (Kazakhstan) 18-23

Pro career
Lunka turned pro in 1996, losing his only notable fight, against WBO Flyweight Title holder Fernando Montiel. Montiel won by TKO in the 7th. Lunka retired after the bout with a record of 21-2-0.

External links
 
 

1970 births
Living people
People from Mureș County
Romanian male boxers
Flyweight boxers
Olympic boxers of Germany
Olympic bronze medalists for Germany
Boxers at the 1996 Summer Olympics
Olympic medalists in boxing
German male boxers
AIBA World Boxing Championships medalists
Medalists at the 1996 Summer Olympics
Romanian emigrants to Germany
German people of Romanian descent